Megachile postnigra is a species of bee in the family Megachilidae. It was described by Theodore Dru Alison Cockerell in 1937.

References

Postnigra
Insects described in 1937